Mark Sanchez (born 1986) is a former American football quarterback.

Mark Sanchez may also refer to:

Mark Sanchez (basketball) (born 1987), American basketball player
Mark Sanchez (make-up artist), American make-up artist
Mark Sanchez (politician), American politician